No zuo no die is a Chinese internet meme. The original wording of the Chinese phrase, meaning "one would not be in trouble had one not asked for it", is half-translated to Chinglish where it retains one of its Chinese characters in pinyin. "Zuo" (作) is a Shanghainese word meaning to "act silly or daring (for attention)".

The original Chinese phrase has become very popular in China. When its Chinglish translation was included in Urban Dictionary in 2014, it generated a lot of interest in the media, interpreted by many Chinese as a sign of China's growing soft power.

References

Internet memes
Chinese words and phrases
Shanghainese